purplera1n was a utility that jailbreaks version 3.0 of the iPhone OS. It achieved this by patching the firmware of the device "on the fly", meaning it edits the firmware located on the device whilst in DFU (Device Firmware Upgrade) mode. It allowed users to install either Cydia or Rock App, a Cydia alternative. This allowed the user to gain access to  the root directory and file system. By gaining access to those, users could install themes, tweaks and other homebrew applications.

Purplera1n was superseded by blackra1n.

See also
 Hardware restrictions#Apple devices
 George Hotz
 Cydia
 Icy
 Rooting (Android OS)

References

Homebrew software
IOS software
IOS jailbreaks